The 2019 Northeast Conference women's basketball tournament is the concluding event of the 2018–19 season of the Northeast Conference (NEC), held from March 11–17, 2019. Unlike most NCAA Division I basketball conference tournaments, the NEC tournament does not include all of the league's teams. The tournament instead features only the top eight teams from regular-season NEC play. Robert Morris won the conference tournament championship game over the St. Francis (PA), 65–54. Nneka Ezeigbo was named the tournament's Most Valuable Player.

Seeds

Bracket

All games will be played at the venue of the higher seed

All-tournament team
Tournament MVP in bold.

See also
2019 Northeast Conference men's basketball tournament

References

 
Northeast Conference women's basketball tournament
Northeast Conference women's basketball tournament